The Saipa Shahin (code name: SP100) is a compact sedan (C-segment) produced by the Iranian manufacturer SAIPA. It was unveiled in 2018 under the name Roham before being renamed Shahin in 2020. Mass production began in December 2020.

Platform 
The Shahin is built on the SAIPA SP1 platform which is the first Iranian platform that the initial design to the final construction have been done in Iran. According to SAIPA, the platform has been developed from the Toyota B platform used on the Toyota Yaris XP90 and has been upgraded to latest technologies.

Engines
The car uses a M15TC 1.5-litre turbocharged engine with a power output of 110 hp and 178 N⋅m of torque. It is compliant with Euro5 emission norm. The car is available with a 5-speed manual transmission and with a cvt automatic transmission. Deliveries of the automatic version have not started yet.

Equipment
The car is equipped with automatic air conditioning, keyless entry with push button start, 7-inch multimedia system, tire pressure monitoring system, rear backup camera, parking sensors and heated side mirrors.

Safety features include 2 airbags and ABS (with brake assist and electronic brakeforce distribution).

Aria

Saipa Aria is the crossover version of Shahin. The height of Aria is slightly higher than Shahin and it has more Equipments .
At first, the engines of Aria and Shahin were supposed to be similar. In another version of this car, the ME16 engine was considered, which is a version of the TU5 PSA engine.
Now, Saipa Aria is going to be launched with a 2-liter imported engine. This engine has Mitsubishi engineering and is an upgraded example of Mitsubishi's 4G94 series, which is produced in the Chinese market by DAE company and is called 4J20V. This 4-cylinder and 16-valve naturally aspirated engine is equipped with variable valve timing technology and produces about 144 hp with a torque of 188 NM in the MPi version. But Saipa seems to have chosen the upgraded GDi version of the 4J20V engine, which produces 150 hp of power with 204 NM of torque.

Aria is supposed to enter the production line with an automatic gearbox from the very beginning. This car has an automatic gearbox with AT structure and will be 6-speed. It is said that the 6AT gearbox of this crossover is supplied by the DAE company as well as the engine. Saipa Aria power transmission system delivers power to the front wheels of this car.

Gallery

References 

Cars of Iran
Saipa vehicles
Cars introduced in 2018